James Steuart may refer to:

 James Steuart (Royal Navy officer) (1690–1757), Admiral of the Fleet
 Sir James Steuart of Coltness (1608–1681), Lord Provost of Edinburgh
 Sir James Stewart (Lord Advocate) (1635–1713), or Steuart, Lord Advocate, 4th son
 Sir James Stewart (advocate) (1681–1727), or Steuart, Solicitor-General of Scotland, son of the 1st Baronet
 Sir James Steuart (economist) (1707–1780), Jacobite and economist, son of the Solicitor-General
 Sir James Steuart Denham, 8th Baronet (1744–1839), general, son of the economist

See also 
 James Stewart (disambiguation)